Leslie Arthur Stainsby (7 June 1898 – 29 April 1942) was an Australian rules footballer who played with Collingwood and Richmond in the Victorian Football League (VFL).

Stainsby spent two seasons at Collingwood, after arriving at the club from New South Wales club Coolamon. In the first he kicked 29 goals, two of them in the 1925 VFL Grand Final, to finish second in Collingwood's goal-kicking, behind Gordon Coventry. He played for Richmond in the 1927 VFL season.

References

1898 births
Australian rules footballers from New South Wales
Collingwood Football Club players
Richmond Football Club players
1942 deaths
People from Mortlake, Victoria
Australian rules footballers from Victoria (Australia)